Barons Bus Lines is an intercity bus company operating in the United States. It serves passengers in the U.S. states of Illinois, Indiana, Michigan, New York, Ohio, Pennsylvania, and West Virginia. Barons Bus operates GoBus, a federally funded bus services that operates scheduled routes through rural parts of Ohio. The company is based in Cleveland, Ohio.

In January 2019, Barons Bus received Metro Magazine's "Operator of the Year" award at the United Motorcoach Association Expo in Fort Lauderdale, Florida.

History 
Starting in 2012, the Goebel Family, former owners of Lakefront Lines (now Coach USA), opened an unassociated company under the name "Barons Bus." The company name originated from the former National Hockey League team based in Cleveland, the Cleveland Barons. In 2014, Barons Bus acquired Cleveland Southeastern Trails, a former bus company located in Bedford, Ohio. As of 2019, Barons Bus continues to expand, only operating new vehicles.

Fleet 

At company startup, Barons Bus operated with used "loaner" buses, provided by MCI, while the order for new buses was being completed.

For a few years, Barons Bus operated 3 different Van Hools for their line-run routes only, due to larger fuel capacity. Those buses were as follows: (1) 2016 Van Hool CX45; (2) 2017 Van Hool CX45.

As of February 2019, Barons Bus now operates a fleet of solely MCI J4500 motorcoaches. Their latest order of MCI's featured increased fuel capacity. The company's buses are typically three years old or newer.

External links

References 

Bus transportation in Illinois
Bus transportation in Indiana
Bus transportation in Michigan
Bus transportation in New York (state)
Bus transportation in Ohio
Bus transportation in Pennsylvania
Bus transportation in West Virginia
Intercity bus companies of the United States
2012 establishments in Ohio
Transportation companies based in Ohio